Swampoodle Grounds aka Capitol Park (II) was the home of the Washington Nationals baseball team of the National League from 1886 to 1889. The name refers to the one-time Swampoodle neighborhood of Washington.

The ballfield was located on a block bounded by North Capitol Street NE and tracks (west); F Street NE (south); Delaware Avenue NE (east); and G Street NE (north); a few blocks north of the Capitol building. Spectators faced toward the south and could see the Capitol dome. They could also see the McDowell and Sons Feed Mill, visible behind right field in the picture, and which was across F Street to the south.

The club moved a few blocks north, from Capitol Park (I) to the Swampoodle location, upon joining the National League. Local papers reported that the new grounds had more space and a more favorable lease. The papers often referred to the new grounds as Capitol Park, even as the previous Capitol Park was still in use, under the same name, for various types of entertainment. When referencing the previous park, the reports would general specify its location, to minimize possible confusion.

Portions of the site were eventually annexed as the site of the Union Station and of the Main Post Office, which is now the National Postal Museum.

Swampoodle Grounds held 6,000. The Washington Statesmen folded after the end of the 1889 season.

External links
Swampoodle Grounds at Project Ballpark
History of the McDowell plant

Baseball venues in Washington, D.C.
Defunct baseball venues in the United States
Defunct sports venues in Washington, D.C.
Demolished buildings and structures in Washington, D.C.
Demolished sports venues in the United States
History of Washington, D.C.
Sports venues completed in 1886
1886 establishments in Washington, D.C.